1. Fußball-Club Köln 01/07 e. V., commonly known as simply FC Köln or FC Cologne in English, is a German professional football club based in Cologne in North Rhine-Westphalia. It was formed in 1948 as a merger of the clubs Kölner Ballspiel-Club 1901 and SpVgg Sülz 07. Köln competes in the Bundesliga after promotion in 2018–19 following relegation to 2. Bundesliga the previous season. The team are three-time national champions, winning the 1962 German football championship, as well as the Bundesliga twice, first in its inaugural season of 1963–64 and then again in 1977–78. The team plays its home matches at RheinEnergieStadion.

The club's nickname Die Geißböcke (The Billy Goats) refers to the club's mascot, a male goat named Hennes after the veteran FC player and later manager Hennes Weisweiler. The first Hennes was donated by a circus entrepreneur as a Cologne carnival joke. The current mascot is Hennes IX as of 1 August 2019 after Hennes VIII was retired by the club due to old age. Another nickname for the club, more common locally due to its ambiguity, is FC (often written as Effzeh), a common German abbreviation for football clubs. Characteristic for the dialect spoken around Cologne, this is pronounced "EF-tsay", in contrast to the Standard German pronunciation of the abbreviation where the second syllable is emphasized. Köln play at home in white and red, both colours having been used as the main shirt colour throughout its history. The club has long-standing rivalries with nearby clubs Borussia Mönchengladbach, Fortuna Düsseldorf, and Bayer Leverkusen.

Like many of Germany's other professional football clubs, 1. FC Köln is part of a larger sports club with teams in other sports like handball, table tennis and gymnastics. 1. FC Köln has over 100,000 members, making it the fourth largest club in Germany.

History

Predecessor sides
Kölner BC was formed on 6 June 1901 by a group of young men who were unhappy as part of the gymnastics club FC Borussia Köln and far more interested in football. BC was a competitive side in the Zehnerliga West in the years before World War I who took the Westdeutsche championship in 1912 and advanced to the preliminary rounds of the national finals. Their next best result was a losing appearance in the 1920 league final, where they lost 1–3 to Borussia Mönchengladbach.

Spielvereinigung 1907 Köln-Sülz was established in 1907 as Sülzer Sportverein and on 1 January 1919 merged with Fußball Club 1908 Hertha Sülz to form SpVgg. They won the Westdeutscher title in 1928 and they too went out in the early rounds of the national finals in their turn on that stage. They went on to play as a top flight club in the Gauliga Mittelrhein, one of sixteen premier level divisions established in 1933 in the re-organization of German football under the Third Reich. The side earned generally good results through the 1930s – including a divisional championship in 1939 – but then faltered in the early 1940s. After the 1941 season the Gauliga Mittlerhein was split into two new divisions: the Gauliga Köln-Aachen and the Gauliga Moselland, which included clubs from occupied Luxembourg. Sülz struggled until they were united with VfL Köln 1899 for the 1943–44 season to form the combined wartime side Kriegspielgemeinschaft VfL 99/Sülz 07 which promptly won the Gauliga Köln-Aachen title by a single point over SG Düren 99 in a close race. The club did not play the next campaign as war overtook the region.

A successful new club

After the union of these two predecessor sides (1948), 1. FC Köln began play in the tough Oberliga West in the 1949–50 season and by 1954 had won their first divisional championship. That same year they lost the DFB-Pokal final 1–0 to VfB Stuttgart. Die Geißböcke won their second divisional championship in 1960 and appeared in the national final against Hamburger SV, where they lost 2–3. They went on to finish first in the Oberliga West in each of the next three seasons and again played their way to the national final in 1962 and 1963. They won the 1962 match 4–0 over 1. FC Nürnberg resulting in entry to the 1962–63 European Cup where they were one of the favourites to win the trophy. In the first round Köln visited Dundee F.C. of Scotland and lost 1–8, and despite winning the second leg back in Germany by 4–0 they were out of the tournament. In the following year's national final they lost 1–3 to Borussia Dortmund.

Continuing success

In 1963, FC Köln was selected as one of the original 16 teams to play in the Bundesliga, Germany's new professional football league. Köln continued their winning ways by becoming the first ever Bundesliga champion in the league's inaugural 1963–64 season. As German champions, Köln entered the 1964–65 European Cup where it met England's Liverpool at the quarter-final stage. After two 0–0 draws, a third game was played which was also a stalemate, this time 2–2. As the penalty shootout had not yet been introduced as the means of deciding a tie, Köln went out of the competition on the toss of a coin. Ironically enough, there was the need for a second coin toss because the first time the coin stuck vertically in the ground. The club also became the first Bundesliga side to field a Brazilian player when it signed Zézé for a then club record fee of DM 150,000. Domestically, Köln recorded a second-place finish in the 1964–65 Bundesliga season and won its first DFB-Pokal in 1967–68.

At the start of the 1970s, Köln reached three DFB-Pokal finals in four seasons, losing all three; to Kickers Offenbach in 1970, Bayern Munich in 1971 and Borussia Mönchengladbach in 1973. The team also achieved another second place Bundesliga finish in 1973 before reaching another DFB-Pokal final in 1977, beating Hertha BSC over two legs to win the trophy for the second time.

In 1977–78, FC Köln enjoyed its most successful season, winning the Bundesliga title, its third national title overall, and retaining the DFB-Pokal. This makes Köln one of only four clubs to have won the double in the Bundesliga era.

Köln had another losing DFB-Pokal final appearance in 1980, before winning the competition for a fourth time in 1983. In 1986, the club appeared in its first European final, losing 5–3 on aggregate to Real Madrid in the UEFA Cup Final. Two second place Bundesliga finishes, in 1988–89 and 1989–90, and another DFB-Pokal final loss in 1991, marked the end of a glorious thirty-year period for FC Köln.

21st century: ups and downs

In recent years, the club's performance has been mixed. The FC holds the dubious distinction of the worst goal drought in Bundesliga history: in 2002, the supporters had to wait 1034 excruciating minutes (equivalent to 11-and-a-half games) until Thomas Cichon found the back of the net again.
In the early years of the Bundesliga, 1. FC Köln was the most successful club in West Germany in terms of total points won. Beginning in the early 1990s, however, the club's performance fell, and in 1998 it was relegated for the first time. Since about 2000, the side has been a "yo-yo team", moving between the first and second divisions. It has returned to the Bundesliga at the end of the 2004–05 season as 2. Bundesliga champions after having been relegated the season before. There was little optimism about their return to the top flight as they were picked by German football magazine kicker as one of the clubs most likely to be relegated.

This prediction came true when Köln lost to Hamburger SV 1–0 in the third-to-last match of the season. The club finished the season in second-last place and was relegated after conceding a league-worst 71 goals. The team's most prolific goal scorer was Lukas Podolski with a total of 12 goals, who transferred to Bayern Munich after the end of the season. He also appeared with the Germany national team at the 2006 FIFA World Cup.

In late 2006, former coach Christoph Daum was convinced to once again take the helm of the 2. Bundesliga club and succeeded in leading the club back to the Bundesliga in 2008. After a successful Bundesliga campaign in 2008–09, Daum left Köln for his former club Fenerbahçe. Köln's former star-striker Lukas Podolski returned for the 2009–10 season.

After a poor run of form in the 2010–11 season, recording only one win from its opening nine Bundesliga fixtures, Köln replaced coach Zvonimir Soldo with Frank Schaefer. Schaefer, who was originally in charge of the under-23 team of Köln, decided after the season that he would rather spend more time with his family than be a coach in the Bundesliga. Former Norwegian international and recent Copenhagen coach Ståle Solbakken replaced him. After earning just eight points in the first 13 matches of the second half of the season, Schaefer and former Köln player Dirk Lottner replaced Solbakken. The club, however, was relegated at the end of the season, finishing in 17th place, having accumulated €33m debt, and €11m negative equity.

Turnaround (2012–2017)
In April 2012 the club members elected a new board of directors, Werner Spinner as president, Markus Ritterbach for marketing, and Toni Schumacher for sport. In the 2012–13 season, under new trainer Holger Stanislawski, Köln finished in fifth place in the 2. Bundesliga, missing out on promotion back to the top division.

In 2012 the board hired Jörg Jakobs as director of football who then got promoted in 2014 to sporting director, chief scout and director of the academy. In January 2013 Alexander Wehrle joined as managing director of FC Köln ltd. Wehrle was working as assistant for VfB Stuttgart president Erwin Staudt, especially for rebuilding the stadium. In summer 2013 Peter Stöger and Manfred Schmid were hired as coaching team, and Jörg Schmadtke as general manager. 2013–14 Köln finished first in the 2. Bundesliga and earned promotion to the top division. It was followed by a 12th place 2014–15, ninth in 2015–16, and fifth place in 2016–17. 25 years after the club's last appearance in international football to date they qualified for the Europa League. After restructuring and repaying debt, equity turned from €11m negative to €20m positive. The turnover increased from €56m in 2012/13 to more than €120m in 2016/17.

Decline and changes (2018–)
After the club's return the European stage, fortunes quickly changed. The team experienced an unsuccessful start to the 2017–18 Bundesliga season gaining only three points from its first sixteen matches. At the same time, the club's Europa League campaign ended after the group stage. This downtrend led to the resignation of Jörg Schmadtke and Stöger's dismissal in December 2017; he was replaced by Stefan Ruthenbeck who was appointed as caretaker manager. In spite of an improved record in the second half of the season, the team finished last and were relegated to 2. Bundesliga at the end of the year.

Ahead of the 2018–19 season, Markus Anfang was appointed manager with a mandate to achieve an immediate return to the top flight. While the club occupied the league's top spot for much of the season, Anfang was let go after a winless streak in April 2019. Just a week later, with André Pawlak at the helm, the team achieved promotion with a 0–4 victory over Greuther Fürth. On 13 May 2019, the club announced that Jahn Regensburg manager Achim Beierlorzer would assume its vacant head coaching position from the upcoming season. He was signed to a contract until 2021. Following an unsuccessful start to the 2019–20 season, which included a 3–2 cup defeat against 1. FC Saarbrücken, the club decided to terminate Beierlorzer's contract on 9 November 2019. Sporting director Armin Veh, who weeks earlier had announced that he would not extend his contract with the club, was also dismissed from his position. On 18 November, former HSV manager Markus Gisdol was appointed to the club's head coaching position, while Horst Heldt was made sporting director. Both signed contracts until 2021. After avoiding relegation at the end of the season, Gisdol's contract was extended until 2023. 

The club found itself in a renewed relegation during the 2020–21 season. On 11 April 2021, after losing to relegation rival Mainz 05, Gisdol was dismissed from his position as head coach. The next day, it was announced that Friedhelm Funkel would take over head coaching duties until the end of the season. On 11 May, it was reported that SC Paderborn manager Steffen Baumgart would succeed Funkel as head coach at the beginning of the 2021–22 season. Funkel's side faced Holstein Kiel in the relegation playoffs. After losing 0–1 at home, his team recorded a 1–5 away win, enabling the club to retain its position in the Bundesliga. On 1 April 2022, the club appointed Christian Keller as its new managing director, a position that had been vacant since the dismissal of Heldt in May 2021.

Stadium

The team plays its home matches in the Müngersdorfer Stadion, also known as the RheinEnergie Stadion for sponsorship purposes. It has a seating capacity of 50,000 and the average attendance in the 2015–16 season was 48,676. The stadium sponsorship comes from a contract with the local power supplier RheinEnergie AG. However, most fans still call the stadium "Müngersdorfer Stadion", named after the suburb of Müngersdorf, where it is located.

The club owns the Geißbockheim training centre, currently known as RheinEnergieSportpark for sponsorship, located in Sülz which is a municipal part of Köln in the southwest of the city. The centre is home to the Franz-Kremer-Stadion the home of 1. FC Köln II.

Honours

Domestic
 Bundesliga
 Champions: 1963–64, 1977–78
Runners-up: 1964–65, 1972–73, 1981–82, 1988–89, 1989–90
 German football championship
 Winners: 1961–62
Runners-up: 1959–60, 1962–63
 DFB-Pokal
Winners: 1967–68, 1976–77, 1977–78, 1982–83
Runners-up: 1953–54, 1969–70, 1970–71, 1972–73, 1979–80, 1990–91
 2. Bundesliga
 Winners: 1999–2000, 2004–05, 2013–14, 2018–19
Runners-up: 2002–03

International
 UEFA Cup
Runners-up: 1985–86
 Uhrencup
Winners: 1991

Regional
 Oberliga West
Winners: 1953–54, 1959–60, 1960–61, 1961–62, 1962–63
Runners-up: 1952–53, 1957–58, 1958–59

Doubles
1977–78: Bundesliga and DFB-Pokal

Reserve team
 German amateur champions: 1981

Youth
 German Under 19 championship
 Champions: 1970–71
 Runners-up: 1973–74, 1982–83, 1991–92
 Under 19 Bundesliga Division West
 Champions: 2007–08
 Runners-up: 2003–04, 2009–10, 2013–14, 2014–15
 Under 19 Juniors DFB-Pokal
 Champions: 2012–13
 Runners-up: 1990–91, 1993–94
 German Under 17 championship
 Champions: 1989–90, 2010–11, 2018–19
 Under 17 Bundesliga Division West
 Champions: 2010–11, 2011–12, 2018–19
 Runners-up: 2008–09

Statistics

Kits

Köln's kits are made by Hummel International, who pay the club €20m over a five-year span.

Rivals
The club's main rivals are Borussia Mönchengladbach, Bayer Leverkusen, and Fortuna Düsseldorf – all clubs from the same Rhine-Ruhr region, near the river Rhine.

Players

Current squad

Players out on loan

Second team squad

Coaching staff

Head coaches since 1963

Women's section

The women's team was promoted to the Bundesliga in 2015. They were directly relegated back to the 2. Frauen-Bundesliga after the 2016–17 season ended, but managed to regain promotion in May 2017 to the Bundesliga.

References

Literature
Grüne, Hardy (2001). Vereinslexikon. Kassel: AGON Sportverlag

External links

The Abseits Guide to German Soccer
FC Köln statistics

 
Football clubs in Germany
Football clubs in Cologne
Association football clubs established in 1948
1948 establishments in Germany
Bundesliga clubs
2. Bundesliga clubs